Holding the Man is a stage adaptation by Tommy Murphy of Tim Conigrave's memoir of the same title. It is one of the most successful Australian plays of recent times and the winner of multiple awards. It premiered in Sydney, and then across Australia, as well as internationally–on London's West End and in Los Angeles.

Productions 
The original production, directed by David Berthold, premiered in 2006 in a critically acclaimed, sold-out season at Sydney's Griffin Theatre Company, Australia's leading new writing theatre, and became the company's highest-grossing production in its 30-year history.

The production played six, highly successful seasons in various theatres around Australia:
 Griffin Theatre Company, 3 November – 23 December 2006.
 Griffin Theatre Company, 7 February – 3 March 2007.
 Sydney Opera House, 9–26 May 2007.
 Company B at Sydney's Belvoir St Theatre, 22 September – 4 November 2007.
 Brisbane Powerhouse, 5–9 March 2008.
 Melbourne Theatre Company as part of its 2008 subscription season, 14 March – 26 April 2008.

The production was remounted at La Boite Theatre Company with a new cast, 16 February – 9 March 2013.

West End (London) season 

This original Australian production was recreated in London’s West End for a limited season from 23 April to 3 July 2010. The cast included Jane Turner, (Kath from TV’s Kath & Kim), and Simon Burke. David Berthold directed and Brian Thomson designed the sets, with costumes and puppets by Micka Agosta. The Trafalgar Studios season was produced by Daniel Sparrow and Mike Walsh, Matthew Henderson and Suzie Franke, Benjamin Jones and Neil Gooding Productions

Other productions 
The North American premiere of Holding the Man was staged by San Francisco's New Conservatory Theater Center, 21 September – 4 November 2007.

A New Zealand production was produced by Silo Theatre (at Auckland's Herald Theatre, Aotea Centre) from 7–29 August 2009, directed by Shane Bosher.

The State Theatre Company of South Australia production ran from 21 October – 13 November 2011 at the Dunstan Playhouse, Adelaide Festival Centre, directed by Rosalba Clemente and starring Nic English, Luke Clayson, Catherine Fitzgerald, Nick Pelomis, Geoff Revell and Ellen Steele. It was designed by Morag Cook, composed by Stuart Day, with lighting design by Mark Shelton and puppets created by Stephanie Fisher.

In 2019, Holding The Man was presented for the first time in New York as a benefit reading for Gay Men's Health Crisis starring Greg Ramsey and Charlie Munday directed by Andrew Victor Myers and Morgan Bartholick.

Los Angeles season 
The Australian Theatre Company presented their production in Los Angeles in May/June 2014 at the Matrix Theater with Larry Moss directing. The production was met with much fanfare with a launch hosted by the Australian Consul General in Los Angeles. The cast featured Nate Jones, Adam J. Yeend, Cameron Daddo, and Roxane Wilson and was very well received by US critics citing Moss' direction, Murphy's writing and the performances of the cast, particularly the two leads.

Publication 
The stage version was published by Currency Press in November 2006 in a double volume with another play by Murphy, Strangers in Between. A new edition of the play was published in April 2010 by Nick Hern Books in the UK to coincide with the London season of the production.

Creative teams

Original Australian creative team 
 Director: David Berthold
 Designer: Brian Thomson
 Costume Designer: Micka Agosta
 Lighting Designer: Stephen Hawker
 Composer & Sound Designer: Basil Hogios
 Associate Sound Designer: Steve Toulmin
 Assistant Director: Nic Dorward
 Timothy Conigrave: Guy Edmonds
 John Caleo: Matthew Zeremes
 Mary-Gert Conigrave and various: Jeanette Cronin
 Dick Conigrave and various: Nicholas Eadie
 Phoebe and various: Robin McLeavy
 Peter Craig and various: Brett Stiller

London creative team 
 Director: David Berthold
 Designer: Brian Thomson
 Costumes and puppets: Micka Agosta
 Lighting Designer: James Whiteside
 Composer & Original Sound Designer: Basil Hogios
 UK Sound Designer: Avgoustos Psillas
 Associate Director: Adam Spreadbury-Maher
 Associate Designer: Morgan Large
 Timothy Conigrave: Guy Edmonds
 John Caleo: Matthew Zeremes
 Mary-Gert Conigrave and various: Jane Turner
 Dick Conigrave and various: Simon Burke
 Phoebe and various: Anna Skellern
 Peter Craig and various: Oliver Farnworth
 Understudy Timothy Conigrave and John Caleo: Oliver Stoney
 Understudy Mary-Gert Conigrave and various: Kali Hughes
 Understudy Dick Conigrave and various: Lawrence Carmichael

New Zealand (Auckland) creative team 
 Director: Shane Bosher
 Set Designer: Rachael Walker
 Costume Designer: Elizabeth Whiting
 Lighting Designer: Jeremy Fern
 Composer & Sound Designer: Andrew McMillan
 Timothy Conigrave: Dan Musgrove
 John Caleo: Charlie McDermott
 Mary-Gert Conigrave, Lois Caleo and various: Alison Bruce
 Dick Conigrave, Bob Caleo and various: Andrew Laing
 Phoebe and various: Michelle Blundell
 Peter Craig, Biscuit, Kevin and various: Matt Whelan

San Francisco creative team 
 Timothy Conigrave: Ben Randle
 John Caleo: Bradly Mena
 Mary-Gert Conigrave, Lois Caleo and various: Danielle Perata
 Dick Conigrave, Bob Caleo and various: Dennis Parks
 Phoebe and various: Nicole Lungerhausen
 Peter Craig, Biscuit, Kevin and various: Wesley Cayabyab

Los Angeles creative team 
 Director: Larry Moss
 Designer: John Iacovelli
 Assistant Director: Peter Blackburn
 Timothy Conigrave: Nate Jones
 John Caleo: Adam J. Yeend
 Mary-Gert Conigrave, Lois Caleo and various: Roxane Wilson
 Dick Conigrave, Bob Caleo and various: Cameron Daddo
 Juliet and various: Adrienne Smith
 Peter Craig, Biscuit and various: Luke O'Sullivan

Awards for stage version 
Winner, 2005 Philip Parsons Young Playwrights Award
 Winner, 2007 New South Wales Premier's Literary Awards, Best Play
 Winner, 2007 Australian Writers' Guild Award (AWGIE), Best Play
 Nomination, 2007 Helpmann Award for Best Play
 Nomination, 2007 Sydney Theatre Awards, Best New Australian Work
 Nomination, 2007 Queensland Premier's Literary Awards, Best Play
 Judges' citation, NSW Premier's Literary Award for Best Play

External links

Articles and interviews 
David Berthold remembers Holding the Man
The Long Embrace — Interview with actors Guy Edmonds and Matt Zeremes
Sydney Morning Herald article on fourth Sydney season
Video interview with playwright Tommy Murphy
Holding the Man Breaks Record — article on success of first production
Unconditional Love — Holding the Man article
Bent TV interview with Guy Edmonds and Matt Zeremes including footage from stage production
Richard Watts interviews Guy Edmonds and Matt Zeremes
Great Theatre Export Heads to London — Sydney Morning Herald

Reviews of original stage production 
Variety
Sydney Morning Herald
Sydney Star Observer
Stagenoise
Australian Stage Online
Eureka Street — A Jesuit Communications Publication
ABC Radio – 2008 Brisbane season
Australian Stage Online — review of 2008 Melbourne season
London Evening Standard — London, 2010
Financial Times, London 2010
The Telegraph, London, 2010
The Daily Express, London, 2010
British Theatre Guide, London, 2010
Broadway World, London, 2010
Music OMH, London, 2010
Theatre Explorer, London, 2010

Australian production information 
Education Notes for Teachers prepared by Belvoir for 2007 season
Brisbane Powerhouse website with information on Brisbane March 2008 season

Articles and interviews from the New Zealand production 
Actor true to Tim’s AIDS journey tale — interview with actor Dan Musgrove
Dramatic times — interview with director Shane Bosher
Performer Charlie McDermott — interview with actor Charlie McDermott

Reviews of New Zealand stage production 
Theatreview
New Zealand Herald

Reviews of San Francisco stage production 
SFGate
BeyondChron

Articles and interviews from the Los Angeles production 
Award-Winning Play, 'Holding the Man' Launches Australian Theatre Company in L.A. — Variety
Holding the Man’ Brings Australian Theatre and a Moving Story of Love and Loss to LA — WeHoVille
Winmalee actor Adam J. Yeend takes hit Aussie play to LA — The Blue Mountains Gazette
Photo Flash: First Look at Australian Theatre Company's LA Premiere of Holding the Man — "Broadway World"

Reviews of Los Angeles stage production directed by Larry Moss 
Los Angeles Times
Broadway World
Stage Scene LA
Gia on the Move
Movie Dearest

References

Australian plays
LGBT-related plays
HIV/AIDS in literature
2006 plays